Efrén Vázquez Rodríguez (born 2 September 1986 in Barakaldo, Spain) is a Spanish Grand Prix motorcycle road racer. He currently is a test rider for KTM's Moto3 project. He has also competed in the 125cc and 250cc world championship classes during his career, and was the 2008 Spanish 125GP championship winner.

At the 2014 Indianapolis Grand Prix, Vázquez achieved his first Grand Prix victory – in his 116th start – after slipstreaming past Romano Fenati on the final straight, prevailing by 0.065 seconds. He added a second victory later in the season, in Malaysia, en route to fourth in the championship.

Career statistics

Grand Prix motorcycle racing

By season

Races by year
(key) (Races in bold indicate pole position; races in italics indicate fastest lap)

References

External links

1986 births
Living people
Spanish motorcycle racers
Sportspeople from Barakaldo
250cc World Championship riders
125cc World Championship riders
Moto3 World Championship riders
Moto2 World Championship riders